Caldwell County is a county in the U.S. state of North Carolina. It is located in the foothills of the Blue Ridge Mountains. As of the 2020 census, the population was 80,652. Its county seat is Lenoir. Caldwell County is part of the Hickory–Lenoir–Morganton, NC Metropolitan Statistical Area.

History
The county was formed in 1841 from parts of Burke County and Wilkes County.  It was named for Joseph Caldwell, presiding professor and the first president of the University of North Carolina at Chapel Hill.

A series of reductions to the county's territory have taken place since its initial formation. In 1847, parts of Caldwell County, Iredell County, and Wilkes County were combined to form Alexander County. In 1849, parts of Caldwell County, Ashe County, Wilkes County, and Yancey County were combined to form Watauga County. In 1861, parts of Caldwell County, Burke County, McDowell County, Watauga County, and Yancey County were combined to form Mitchell County.  Finally, in 1911 parts of Caldwell County, Mitchell County, and Watauga County were combined to form Avery County.

Geography

Caldwell County is divided into three distinct geographic sections: the Blue Ridge Mountains, which dominate the northern and western parts of the county; the gently rolling Piedmont country in the middle and southern parts of the county; and the Brushy Mountains, an isolated remnant of the Blue Ridge Mountains. The "Brushies", as they are often called, run across much of Caldwell County's eastern section. Hibriten Mountain, located within the city limits of Lenoir, the county's largest city, marks the western end of the Brushy Mountain range. In the western part of the county is the Wilson Creek area.

National protected areas
 Blue Ridge Parkway (part)
 Pisgah National Forest (part)

State and local protected areas 
 Backbone Ridge State Forest
 Grandfather Mountain State Park (part)
 Tuttle Educational State Forest

Major water bodies 
 Beaver Creek
 Blue Creek
 Catawba River
 Gunpowder Creek
 Husband Creek
 Johns River
 Lake Hickory
 Little Gunpowder Creek
 Little King Creek
 Lower Creek
 Mill Creek
 Mulberry Creek
 Rhodhiss Lake
 Rock Creek
 Silver Creek
 Upper Little River
 Wilson Creek
 Yadkin River

Adjacent counties
 Watauga County - north
 Wilkes County - northeast
 Alexander County - east
 Catawba County - southeast
 Burke County - south
 Avery County - west

Major highways
 
 
 , busiest highway in the county with an annual average daily traffic count of 39,000.

Major infrastructure 
 Caldwell County has one railroad, the Caldwell County Railroad which interchanges with the Norfolk Southern Railway in Hickory, North Carolina.
 Foothills Regional Airport (partially in Burke County)

Demographics

2020 census

As of the 2020 United States census, there were 80,652 people, 32,513 households, and 20,975 families residing in the county.

2010 census
As of the census of 2010, there were 83,029 people, 33,388 households, and 23,456 families residing in the county.  The population density was 176.1 people per square mile (109.4/km2).  There were 37,659 housing units at an average density of 79.9 per square mile (49.6/km2).  The racial makeup of the county was 90.24% White, 4.92% Black or African American, 0.52% Asian, 0.31% Native American, 0.03% Pacific Islander, 2.47% from other races, and 1.51% from two or more races.  The Hispanic or Latino (of any race) population was 4.57%.

There were 33,388 households, of which 32.40% had children under the age of 18 living with them, 52.16% were married couples living together, 12.52% had a female householder with no husband present, and 29.75% were non-families. 25.39% of all households were made up of individuals living alone, and 41.16% of those households had someone living alone who was 65 years of age or older.  The average household size was 2.46 and the average family size was 2.91.

Of the county's entire population, 22.63% was under the age of 18, 18.33% were 18 to 34, 22.44% were 35 to 49, 21.17% were 50 to 64, and 15.44% were 65 years of age or older. The median age was 41.3 years. For every 100 females there were 96.84 males.  For every 100 females age 18 and over, there were 95.06 males.

The median income for a household in the county was $34,853, and the median income for a family was $47,028. Males had a median income of $36,429 versus $31,221 for females. The per capita income for the county was $19,397.  About 15.3% of families and 20.50% of the population were below the poverty line, including 51.8% of single mothers and 13.2% of people age 65 or over.

Government and politics
The county is governed by a five-member Board of Commissioners. They are elected by popular vote and appoint a County Manager to handle daily operations.  The members of the Board of Commissioners are Jeff Branch, Randy Church, Mike LaBrose, Donnie Potter, and Robbie Wilkie. Caldwell County's sheriff is Alan C. Jones. The Clerk of Superior Court is Angela Ashley Kidd. The County's Register of Deeds is Wayne Rash. Caldwell County is a member of the regional Western Piedmont Council of Governments.

In the North Carolina General Assembly, the county is represented by Republican Warren Daniel in the North Carolina Senate, as part of N.C. Senate district 46, and by Republican Destin Hall in the North Carolina House of Representatives, as N.C. House District 87.

Caldwell County is part of North Carolina's 5th congressional district in the United States House of Representatives and is represented by Republican Virginia Foxx. The county was moved from North Carolina's 11th congressional district in 2021 due to court ordered redistricting in North Carolina. North Carolina's congressional districts for 2023 and beyond have not yet been approved.

Caldwell County's partisan lean is very Republican. Of the county's elected legislative representatives at the county, state, and national level, all are Republicans. Since 2010, the average federal election vote in Caldwell County goes over 70% Republican.

Education

Elementary schools
 Baton
 Davenport
 Dudley Shoals
 Gamewell
 Granite Falls
 Hudson
 Lower Creek
 Sawmills
 Valmead
 West Lenoir
 Whitnel

K-8 schools
 Collettsville
 Happy Valley
 Kings Creek
 Oak Hill Charter School

Middle schools
 Gamewell
 Granite Falls
 Hudson
 William Lenoir

High schools
 Caldwell Applied Sciences Academy
 Caldwell Early College
 Hibriten
 South Caldwell
 West Caldwell

Alternative schools
 Horizons Elementary
 Gateway School

Private schools
 Heritage Christian School (K-12)

Independent school
 Moravian Prep

College
 Caldwell Community College & Technical Institute
 Appalachian State University Center at Caldwell (a distance education site for Appalachian State University)

Communities

Townships 
Townships in Caldwell County include:
 Globe
 Hudson
 Johns River
 Kings Creek
 Lenoir
 Little River
 Lovelady
 Lower Creek
 Mullberry
 North Catawba
 Paterson
 WIlson Creek
 Yadkin Valley

City
 Lenoir (county seat and largest city)

Towns
 Blowing Rock
 Cajah's Mountain
 Gamewell
 Granite Falls
 Hudson
 Rhodhiss
 Sawmills

Village
 Cedar Rock

Census-designated place
 Northlakes

Other unincorporated communities
 Collettsville
 Patterson

See also
 List of counties in North Carolina
 National Register of Historic Places listings in Caldwell County, North Carolina
 North Carolina State Parks
 National Park Service
 List of North Carolina state forests
 List of national forests of the United States

References

External links

 
 
 Caldwell County Economic Development Commission

 
Counties of Appalachia
Western North Carolina
1841 establishments in North Carolina